Irish Gold is the first of the Nuala Anne McGrail series of mystery novels by Roman Catholic priest and author Father Andrew M. Greeley.

 
The title "Irish Gold" refers to the gold allegedly accepted by Roger Casement in order to finance the resistance against the English crown.

1994 American novels
Nuala Anne McGrail series
Novels by Andrew M. Greeley
Forge Books books